This is a list of episodes of the Extreme Makeover: Home Edition series. Extreme Makeover: Home Edition started on February 15, 2004 and ended on January 13, 2012. The show ran for 209 episodes spanning 9 seasons, and 11 special episodes. A run of new specials aired in December 2012. In January 2019, it was announced that HGTV had revived the show and new regular episodes would begin airing in 2020.

Episodes

Season 1 (2004)

Season 2 (2004–05)

Season 3 (2005–06)

Season 4 (2006–07)

Season 5 (2007–08)

Season 6 (2008–09)

Season 7 (2009–10)

Season 8 (2010–11)

Season 9 (2011–12)

Specials
<onlyinclude>

References

Lists of American reality television series episodes
Lists of American non-fiction television series episodes